"The Paper Menagerie" is a 2011 fantasy/magical realism short story by Ken Liu. It was first published in The Magazine of Fantasy & Science Fiction.

Synopsis 
Jack, a little boy from Connecticut, enjoys playing with origami animals that his Chinese mother makes for him and that come to life when she blows into them. As Jack grows into a teenager he tries to fit in with his American friends and starts to ignore the origami animals and his mother, who tries very hard to speak English and change her habits in order to please him. After a family tragedy takes place Jack finds a message from his mother in one of the origami animals and learns about her past.

Reception 
The story became the first work of fiction to win all of the Nebula, the Hugo and the World Fantasy Awards. The South China Morning Post praised the story.

References 

2011 short stories
Fantasy short stories
Nebula Award for Best Short Story-winning works
Hugo Award for Best Short Story winning works
World Fantasy Award-winning works
Fiction about origami